This is a list of telenovelas currently broadcast, scheduled to be broadcast or formerly broadcast on Univision tlnovelas, a Spanish-language American cable television network.

Telenovelas currently broadcast

Upcoming programming

Former programming

Telenovelas produced from 2010 to 2019

Telenovelas produced from 2000 to 2009

Telenovelas produced from 1990 to 1999

Telenovelas produced from 1980 to 1989

References 

Univision telenovelas
Univision